The North Macedonia border barrier is a border barrier built by North Macedonia on its border with Greece. It was constructed as a response to the European migrant crisis. The construction of the barrier began in November 2015, modeled similarly to the Hungarian border barrier.

History

On 29 November 2015, the Macedonian army began erecting fences on the Greek border. A Moroccan man was injured in an accident that led to clashes between police and migrants that injured 18. In the early stage of the construction of the barrier, Macedonian police were attacked by the migrants, according to The Guardian. In February, Macedonian soldiers began erecting a second fence meters away from the previous one.

After Austria started to limit asylum applications on its territory in February, Slovenia, Serbia, and other Balkan states imposed restrictions on migrant entries. As a result, Macedonia restricted migrant entries to its territory, which stranded thousands of migrants in Greece, especially near Idomeni border crossing. On 29 February 2016, a group of hundreds of migrants attacked riot police with stones and attempted to break the border barrier using a battering ram made from vandalized street signs and a lamp post.

The European Union gave political and financial support for the fences. It was commented that it must be extraordinary that the European Union pays a third country to protect itself from a member country.

Idomeni migrant camp
In January 2016, Austria limited the number of immigrants that were allowed to be in the country at the same time. In February 2016, Austrian interior minister Mickl-Leitner announced a cap on the number of transiting migrants per day. Subsequently, Slovenia barred migrants from transiting through its territory and Macedonia announced the closure of its Greek border to migrants. Albania deployed extra police to guard its borders and received assistance from Italy in form of "men and equipment" on both land and sea.

In May 2016, Reuters reported that more than 10,000 migrants were settled on the border in what has become Europe's largest refugee camp with mosques, schools, and businesses.

See also

Austrian border barrier
Bulgarian border barrier
Greek border barrier
Hungarian border barrier
Norway–Russia border barrier
Slovene border barrier
Greece–North Macedonia relations
Accession of North Macedonia to the European Union

References

External links

Border barriers constructed during the European migrant crisis
2015 in the Republic of Macedonia
Greece–North Macedonia border